Cechenena is a genus of moths in the family Sphingidae first described by Walter Rothschild and Karl Jordan in 1903.

Species
Cechenena aegrota (Butler 1875)
Cechenena catori (Rothschild, 1894)
Cechenena chimaera (Rothschild, 1894)
Cechenena helops (Walker 1856)
Cechenena lineosa (Walker 1856)
Cechenena minor (Butler 1875)
Cechenena mirabilis (Butler 1875)
Cechenena pollux (Boisduval 1875)
Cechenena scotti Rothschild 1920
Cechenena sperlingi Eitschberger, 2007
Cechenena subangustata Rothschild 1920
Cechenena transpacifica Clark 1923

Gallery

References

 
Macroglossini
Moth genera
Taxa named by Walter Rothschild
Taxa named by Karl Jordan